The Tihany Abbey is a Benedictine monastery established in Tihany in the Kingdom of Hungary in 1055. Its patrons are the Virgin Mary and Saint Aignan of Orleans.

Foundation
The Benedictine monastery in Tihany was established in 1055 by King Andrew I of Hungary (r. 1046–1060). It was dedicated to the Holy Virgin and to Saint Bishop Aignan of Orleans. King Andrew was buried in the church of the monastery in 1060. His tomb in the crypt of the church is the only grave of a medieval King of Hungary which has been preserved up until now.

The church's ceiling is decorated with frescoes by Károly Lotz, depicting Faith, Hope and Love.

Gallery

See also
 Establishing charter of the abbey of Tihany

References

Sources

External links

 Tihanyi Bencés Apátság

Benedictine monasteries in Hungary
Religious organizations established in the 1050s
1055 establishments in Europe